Cosmoclostis pesseuta is a species of moth of the family Pterophoridae. It is found in India and Sri Lanka but has also been recorded from New Guinea and the Bismarck Archipelago. Recently, it has also been collected in Queensland, Australia.

Larvae have been reared from Premna latifolia.

References

External links
Trin Wiki
Papua Insects
Notes on South Pacific Pterophoridae

Moths of Australia
Pterophorini
Moths of Asia
Moths of Sri Lanka
Moths of New Guinea
Moths described in 1906